Abdullah Ommidvar (29 September 1932 – 14 July 2022) was an Iranian-Chilean film director and producer.

Partial filmography
Johnny 100 Pesos

References

1932 births
2022 deaths
Iranian film producers
Chilean film producers
Chilean people of Iranian descent
People from Tehran